Bruno Akrapović (born 26 September 1967) is a Bosnian professional football manager and former player who played as a midfielder. He was most recently the head coach of First Division club Akritas Chlorakas.

Club career
Starting his career in his native Bosnia, at the time part of Yugoslavia, Akrapović spent the majority of his career playing for various clubs in the Bundesliga and 2. Bundesliga. He played for Energie Cottbus from 2000 until 2002. He played alongside Jürgen Klopp at Mainz.

International career
Akrapović made his senior debut for Bosnia and Herzegovina in a March 2000 friendly match against Macedonia and has earned a total of 14 caps, scoring one goal. His final international was a September 2002 European Championship qualification match against Romania.

International goal
Scores and results list Bosnia and Herzegovina's goal tally first, score column indicates score after Akrapović goal.

Managerial career
Akrapović recently coached KF Shkëndija in the Macedonian First League and  RNK Split in Croatia before relocating to Bulgaria in 2017 to become the manager of Lokomotiv Plovdiv where he won twice in a row the Bulgarian Cup in 2018–19 and 2019–20 and the Bulgarian Supercup in 2020.

On 16 January 2010, Akrapović received his UEFA Pro Licence in Football Association of Bosnia and Herzegovina's educational facility in Jablanica.

On 14 June 2022, Akrapović was appointed as manager of Saudi club Al-Wehda. On 20 October 2022, Akrapović was sacked after only 2 wins in 8 matches.

On 30 December 2022, Akrapović was appointed as manager of Cypriot club Akritas Chlorakas. On 27 February 2023, Akrapović was sacked after only 2 months.

Personal life
Akrapović's wife is Italian and their son Aaron Akrapović used to represent Italy U17.

Managerial statistics
As of 27 February 2023

Honours

Manager
Lokomotiv Plovdiv
Bulgarian Cup: 2018–19, 2019–20
Bulgarian Supercup: 2019–20

References

External links

Profile at Soccerpunter.com

1967 births
Living people
Sportspeople from Zenica
Croats of Bosnia and Herzegovina
Association football midfielders
Yugoslav footballers
Bosnia and Herzegovina footballers
Bosnia and Herzegovina international footballers
NK Čelik Zenica players
SV Arminia Hannover players
TuS Celle FC players
VfL Wolfsburg players
1. FSV Mainz 05 players
Tennis Borussia Berlin players
FC Energie Cottbus players
FC Rot-Weiß Erfurt players
Kickers Offenbach players
2. Bundesliga players
Regionalliga players
Bundesliga players
Yugoslav expatriate footballers
Expatriate footballers in Germany
Yugoslav expatriate sportspeople in Germany
Bosnia and Herzegovina expatriate footballers
Bosnia and Herzegovina expatriate sportspeople in Germany
Bosnia and Herzegovina football managers
Saudi Professional League managers
FK Shkëndija managers
RNK Split managers
PFC Lokomotiv Plovdiv managers
PFC CSKA Sofia managers
Al-Wehda Club (Mecca) managers
Bosnia and Herzegovina expatriate football managers
Expatriate football managers in Gibraltar
Bosnia and Herzegovina expatriates in Gibraltar
Expatriate football managers in North Macedonia
Bosnia and Herzegovina expatriate sportspeople in North Macedonia
Expatriate football managers in Bulgaria
Bosnia and Herzegovina expatriate sportspeople in Bulgaria
Expatriate football managers in Saudi Arabia
Bosnia and Herzegovina expatriate sportspeople in Saudi Arabia